Dubrovačko Primorje ("Dubrovnik Littoral")  is municipality situated northwest of the city Dubrovnik in Dubrovnik-Neretva County in southern Croatia. The municipality's borders extend all the way up to Neum, Bosnia and Herzegovina. The center of the municipality is the village of Slano. Dubrovačko Primorje is underdeveloped municipality which is statistically classified as the First Category Area of Special State Concern by the Government of Croatia.

Settlements in Dubrovačko Primorje Municipality are:

 Banići - 139
 Čepikuće - 63
 Doli - 189
 Imotica - 122
 Kručica - 34
 Lisac - 36
 Majkovi - 194
 Mravnica - 38
 Ošlje - 120
 Podgora - 19
 Podimoć - 52
 Slano - 579
 Smokovljani - 66
 Stupa - 77
 Štedrica - 58
 Točionik - 23
 Topolo - 154
 Trnova - 44
 Trnovica - 35
 Visočani - 130

References

Dubrovnik-Neretva County
Municipalities of Croatia